Titanium FC or Travancore Titanium FC or later known as Titanium Trivandrum FC is a professional football club based in Travancore, Kerala, India (present day Thiruvananthapuram). It participated in Kerala Premier League and participated in National Football League Second Division and I-League 2nd Division in past.

History
During the 1970s, Titanium Football team was one of the most acclaimed football clubs in Kerala, winning many trophies. Players like B. Sasikumaran Pillai, Sankarankutty, Abdul Hameed, Najumuddin, Thomas Sebastian, Abdul Rasheed Kariyambath, V. Jayakumar, Ebin Rose, Shahjahan, Shaukath, Martin, Shabeer and Usman were members of Titanium Football team.

Honors 

 Kerala Football League

  Runners-up (1): 2000–01

 Kerala State Club Football Championship

  Champions (10): 1973, 1978, 1989, 1990, 1992, 1993, 1994, 2000, 2004, 2005
  Runners-up (8): 1976, 1984, 1985, 1986, 1988, 1995, 2002, 2008

 Sait Nagjee Football Tournament

  Runners-up (3): 1973, 1978, 1992

 Tirur All-India Football Tournament
 Runners-up (1): 2006

References

Football clubs in Kerala
Kerala Premier League
Defunct football clubs in India
Works association football clubs in India
Sport in Thiruvananthapuram
I-League 2nd Division clubs